The Dominican Republic competed at the 1992 Summer Olympics in Barcelona, Spain.

Competitors
The following is the list of number of competitors in the Games.

Results by event

Baseball
The Dominican team won two of its seven games in the preliminary round of the first Olympic baseball tournament, defeating Italy and Spain.  Its record put the team in sixth place and out of further contention.

Men's Team Competition:
 Dominican Republic - 6th place (2-5)
Team Roster
Félix Nova  
José Ramón Veras  
Manuel Guzmán   
Fabio Aquino  
Roberto Casey  
Eugenio Váldez  
Rafelito Mercedes  
Félix Tejada   
Teófilo Peña  
Alexis Peña   
Fausto Peña   
Teodoro Novas  
Cipriano Ventura  
Juan Sánchez   
Juan Viñas   
Roque Solano  
Silvestre Popoteur  
Elias Olivos   
Benjamin Heredia  
José Santana

Boxing
Men's Light Flyweight (– 48 kg)
 Fausto del Rosario
 First Round — Lost to Eric Griffin (USA), 2:14

Men's Flyweight
 Héctor Avila

Men's Bantamweight
 Agustin Castillo

Men's Featherweight
 Victoriano Sosa

Men's Light-Welterweight
 Rafael Romero

Men's Welterweight
 César Ramos

Judo
Men's Extra-Lightweight
Gilberto García

Men's Half-Lightweight
Ekers Raposo

Women's Lightweight
Altagracia Contreras

Women's Half-Middleweight
Eleucadia Vargas

Weightlifting

Wrestling
Men's Greco-Roman Flyweight 
Ulises Valentin

See also
Dominican Republic at the 1991 Pan American Games

References

Sources
Official Olympic Reports
sports-reference
 

Nations at the 1992 Summer Olympics
1992
Summer Olympics